National Route 347 is a national highway of Japan connecting Sagae, Yamagata and Ōsaki, Miyagi in Japan, with a total length of 90.1 km (55.99 mi).

A segment of Route 347 between Obanazawa, Yamagata and Kami, Miyagi is closed in winter.

References

National highways in Japan
Roads in Miyagi Prefecture
Roads in Yamagata Prefecture